Opare Leticia (born 5 March ), known by her stage name Gyaldem Tish is a Ghanaian Afropop, dancehall and reggae singer.

Early life and career 
Gyaldem Tish was born to Mr & Mrs Opare in Donkorkrom, Kwahu Afram Plains North in the Eastern Region of Ghana. After Junior High School, she moved to Mpraeso to further her Education in the Secondary Level. Her passion for music developed when she was in High school.

She released her first official single in 2018 titled "UnderTaker" which gained her some recognition in the country. And she released "iWoman" shortly after. She also joined some bands to perform some of the nation's most popular songs.

Discography

Singles 

 "UnderTaker"
 "iWoman"
 "Suffer Get" ft Dhat Gyal
 "Nuh Care" ft Quame Rhymz
 "Fear No Man"
 "Your Grace"
"Broken"
"Whine Fi Me" ft Elly Element

Awards and nominations

Videography

References 

Living people
21st-century Ghanaian women singers
21st-century Ghanaian singers
Year of birth missing (living people)